Alligator Woman is a 1982 album by the American funk band Cameo, released by Casablanca Records. It is the group's eighth studio album, and the first released after group leader Larry Blackmon reduced the band from 11 members to 5 (himself, Tomi Jenkins, Nathan Leftenant, Charlie Singleton, and Gregory Johnson (who would leave the band prior to their next album). Alligator Woman combined Cameo’s traditional funk with elements of rock and new wave, and was the band’s fifth consecutive album to be certified Gold by the RIAA for sales of over 500,000 copies.  The cover artwork model is the Canadian singer/model Vanity (Denise Matthews).

Track listing

Personnel
 Backing vocals - Charlie Singleton, Gregory Johnson, Larry Blackmon, Nathan Leftenant, Tomi Jenkins
 Bass guitar - Michael Burnett
 Drums, percussion - Larry Blackmon
 Guitar - Charlie Singleton
 Keyboards - Charlie Singleton, Gregory Johnson, Kevin Kendricks, Randy Stern
 Lead vocals - Charlie Singleton, Larry Blackmon, Tomi Jenkins
 Mixed by - Larry Blackmon, Tom Race
 Producer - Larry Blackmon
 Trumpet - Nathan Leftenant

Charts

Weekly charts

Year-end charts

Singles
"Be Yourself"
"Flirt" 
"Alligator Woman"

References

Cameo (band) albums
1982 albums
Casablanca Records albums